Who Do You Think You Are? is an Australian television documentary reality genealogy series, part of the international franchise and an adaptation of the original British series on BBC of the same name, airing on SBS. SBS first aired six episodes of the BBC series in late 2007, followed by six Australian episodes beginning 13 January 2008 and then six more from the original BBC version. Each episode profiles a celebrity tracing their family tree and is narrated by Richard Mellick.

SBS renewed the series for a sixth series on 29 August 2012.
The seventh season aired on SBS from 4 August 2015. The eighth season started on Tuesday, 13 September 2016. The ninth season started on Tuesday 17 April 2018. Season 10 began on 30 April 2019. Season 11 began airing on 19 May 2020. Season 12 began airing on 8 June 2021. Season 13 began airing on 21 June 2022.

Series Summary

Episodes

Season 1 (2008)

Season 2 (2009)

Season 3 (2010–2011)

Season 4 (2012)

Season 5 (2013)

Season 6 (2014)

Season 7 (2015)

Season 8 (2016)

Season 9 (2018)

Season 10 (2019)

Season 11 (2020)

Season 12 (2021)

Season 13 (2022)

Events
The success of the series led to SBS TV and the National Archives of Australia jointly organising a Shake Your Family Tree Day on 27 February 2008 to promote genealogy.

DVD releases

References

External links
 Official website
 Who Do You Think You Are? at Artemis Media (seasons 1, 2, 3 , 4, 5, 6, and 7)
 

2000s Australian documentary television series
2008 Australian television series debuts
2010s Australian documentary television series
Television series about family history
Special Broadcasting Service original programming
English-language television shows
2020s Australian documentary television series